Ana Amicarella (born 9 April 1966) is a former synchronized swimmer from Venezuela. She competed in the women's solo competition at the 1984 Summer Olympics.

References 

1966 births
Living people
Venezuelan synchronized swimmers
Olympic synchronized swimmers of Venezuela
Synchronized swimmers at the 1984 Summer Olympics
Pan American Games medalists in synchronized swimming
Pan American Games bronze medalists for Venezuela
Synchronized swimmers at the 1983 Pan American Games
Medalists at the 1983 Pan American Games
20th-century Venezuelan women